The 1981 BYU Cougars football team represented Brigham Young University (BYU) in the 1981 NCAA Division I-A football season. The Cougars were led by 10th-year head coach LaVell Edwards and played their home games at Cougar Stadium in Provo, Utah. The team competed as a member of the Western Athletic Conference, winning their sixth consecutive conference title with a conference record of 7–1. BYU was invited to the 1981 Holiday Bowl, where they defeated Washington State. They were ranked 13th in the final AP Poll with an overall record of 11–2.

Schedule

Personnel

Season summary

at Long Beach State

Air Force

at UTEP

at Colorado

Utah State

UNLV

at San Diego State

at Wyoming

New Mexico

at Colorado State

at Hawaii

Utah

Source: Eugene Register-Guard
    
    
    
    
    
    
    
    
    
    
    
    
    

Jim McMahon passes for 565 yards and becomes the NCAA's career leader in the category.

Holiday Bowl (vs Washington State)

Team players in the NFL
The following were selected in the 1982 NFL Draft.

Awards and honors
Jim McMahon – Sammy Baugh Trophy, Davey O'Brien Award

References

BYU
BYU Cougars football seasons
Western Athletic Conference football champion seasons
Holiday Bowl champion seasons
BYU Cougars football